Louisiana Highway 182 (LA 182) is a state highway located in central and southeastern Louisiana.  It runs  in a northwest to southeast direction from LA 29 in Whiteville to U.S. Highway 90 (US 90) north of Raceland.

Along the way, the highway serves the cities of Opelousas, Lafayette, New Iberia, Morgan City, and Houma.  LA 182 is generally bannered as a north–south highway north of Lafayette (where it largely parallels US 167) and as an east–west highway from Lafayette to Raceland (where it parallels US 90).  Today, most of LA 182 follows the previous alignments of US 90 and US 167 before their re-routing onto newer four-lane alignments. Additionally, the former US 90 alignment between Lafayette and Raceland was once part of the earlier Old Spanish Trail and is still known as such in many places along the route.

In 2015, a rerouting of LA 182 around Broussard via LA 89-1 and US 90, along with a section of the old route through Broussard being retired to local authorities, led to the creation of two auxiliary routes from the remaining state-owned sections of the old alignment. These short highways were known as LA 182-1 and LA 182-2 respectively, and were both located almost entirely within Broussard. Both auxiliary routes were retired in the summer of 2022.

Route description

Whiteville to Lafayette
From the northwest, LA 182 begins at an intersection with LA 29 in an area of northern St. Landry Parish known as Whiteville.  It proceeds in a southeast direction to an intersection with LA 10 in Beggs.  Here the two highways turn to the south and begin a concurrency, passing through an interchange with I-49 south of Macland.  In Washington, LA 182 and LA 10 intersect LA 103, which heads to Ville Platte to the west.  In Nuba, the concurrency with LA 10 ends at an intersection with US 167 as LA 10 turns west to follow US 167.  Just to the east, US 167 joins I-49 through Opelousas to Lafayette.

In Opelousas, LA 182 intersects US 190 on its path between Eunice and Krotz Springs.  South of Opelousas and an area known as Shuteston, LA 182 turns to the east into Sunset and the adjacent Grand Coteau.  Here it intersects LA 93, which connects LA 182 to I-49/US 167 just to the east and proceeds toward Arnaudville.  LA 182 crosses over I-49/US 167 with ramps to frontage roads that connect to the LA 93 interchange.  Just after exiting Grand Coteau, LA 182 turns to the southeast and crosses into Lafayette Parish.

Soon after crossing the parish line, LA 182 intersects I-49 (still concurrent with US 167) once more and turns to the south through Carencro.  LA 182 curves to the southeast, enters the city of Lafayette, and intersects I-10/US 167 between Lake Charles on the west and Baton Rouge on the east.

Lafayette to Morgan City
From the junction with I-10, LA 182 shares a concurrency with I-10 and US 167 eastward to the intersection with southern terminus of I-49 and the Evangeline Thruway. US 167 leaves I-10, heading north along I-49 towards Alexandria, while LA 182 heads south along the Evangeline Thruway. At Cameron Street, in downtown Lafayette, US 90 comes in from the west and joins LA 182 heading south to exit 115B, where LA 182 splits off, becoming the frontage roads of US 90 for a short distance. Eastbound LA 182, which is the west frontage road, curves southeast under US 90 along the BNSF/Union Pacific Railroad tracks. On the other side of US 90, eastbound LA 182 merges back with westbound LA 182 (the east frontage road), before arriving at an intersection with LA 96 to St. Martinville, then LA  continues southeast into St. Martin Parish.

LA 182 passes briefly through the southwest corner of St. Martin Parish, intersecting LA 92-1 in an area known as Cade.  It then crosses into Iberia Parish, immediately intersecting LA 88.  LA 182 enters New Iberia and separates to follow St. Peter Street eastbound and Main Street westbound throughout the city limits.  It intersects a number of state highways, including LA 86, which follows Bayou Teche north to Loreauville, and LA 14, which proceeds west through Delcambre to Abbeville.  LA 182 also begins to parallel Bayou Teche out of New Iberia, through Jeanerette, and into St. Mary Parish.

In St. Mary Parish, LA 182 passes through Baldwin and Franklin, cutting across some wide bends in Bayou Teche.  In Baldwin, LA 182 intersects LA 83, which heads west to Cypremort Point.  Southeast of Franklin at a point known as Calumet, LA 182 briefly joins US 90 across the Wax Lake Outlet bridge.  Splitting from US 90, LA 182 proceeds along Bayou Teche and the Lower Atchafalaya River through Patterson, Bayou Vista, and Berwick with no state highway junctions.  In Berwick, LA 182 again connects with US 90 but maintains its own parallel bridge crossing over the Lower Atchafalaya River/Berwick Bay into Morgan City.

Morgan City to Raceland
In Morgan City, LA 182 proceeds briefly along Brashear Avenue then curves south through an interchange with US 90 and an intersection with LA 70 (9th Street).  Here the route becomes co-signed as US 90 Business out of Morgan City and into Assumption Parish.  After crossing Bayou Boeuf, LA 182 passes briefly through the southern tip of Assumption Parish.  The concurrency with US 90 Business ends at an intersection with LA 662 just inside the parish line as US 90 Business heads north on that highway to reconnect with its parent route.

After crossing into Terrebonne Parish, LA 182 intersects LA 20, which heads toward Schriever and Thibodaux.  Here, in an area known as Gibson, LA 182 turns to the southeast away from US 90, which bypasses Houma to the north.  LA 182 follows a long stretch of Bayou Black into Houma where it turns north across the bayou at an intersection with LA 315.  The highway continues through Houma on Barrow Street and crosses Bayou Terrebonne, where it makes a jog onto New Orleans Boulevard via a brief concurrency with LA 24, Houma's main thoroughfare.  LA 182 follows New Orleans Boulevard north out of town and crosses into Lafourche Parish.

Just south of Raceland, LA 182 engages in an interchange with US 90 and continues north into town.  Reaching Bayou Lafourche, LA 182 turns east briefly onto LA 1 before turning north and crossing the bayou.  The highway reaches its end at a final junction with US 90, which continues northeast toward New Orleans.

History
The original route of LA 182 as designated in the 1955 Louisiana Highway renumbering included only the northernmost section from LA 29 in Whiteville to LA 10 in Beggs.  It was subsequently extended southeast over former sections of US 167 and US 90 bypassed by newer, four-lane alignments (built under the temporary designation of LA 3052).  The upgraded US 167 was later absorbed into the southernmost part of I-49.

The first extension of LA 182 occurred about 1962 when US 167 was shifted onto a new four-lane alignment between Opelousas and Sunset.  Around 1965, this alignment was extended south from Sunset to Lafayette (as US 167) and from Lafayette to Broussard (as US 90).  At this time, a section of US 90 west of Morgan City was bypassed.  LA 182 now continued south from Sunset along former US 167 to Lafayette, along former US 90 to Broussard, and was co-signed with US 90 to Calumet.  Here, LA 182 split from US 90 to follow the two bends of Bayou Teche that had been bypassed between Calumet and Berwick.  The intervening section of US 90 was gradually re-routed over the next two decades onto its current alignment as follows:
 From Broussard to LA 88 northwest of New Iberia about 1967
 From LA 88 to LA 14 in New Iberia about 1969
 From LA 14 to LA 85 near Jeanerette about 1971
 From LA 85 to LA 316 east of Jeanerette by 1976
 From LA 316 to LA 83 in Baldwin by 1979
 From LA 83 to LA 182 at Calumet about 1981

Meanwhile, the US 90 bypass of Raceland was opened in 1978 with the old alignment becoming LA 3198 and LA 3199.  LA 182 replaced these routes upon its final extension in 1999 with the completion of the US 90 freeway between Morgan City and Raceland. In 2015, LA 182 was re-routed along LA 89-1 and US 90, bypassing Broussard, after the section of Main Street between South Bernard Road and South De Porres Street was retired and handed over to the city. The remaining state-maintained sections of the original became auxiliary routes, LA 182-1 and LA 182-2 respectively.

On July 21, 2022, LA 182 was re-routed after the entire route through Lafayette was retired from the state highway system, being handed over to the city of Lafayette, along with US 90 Business (which was also eliminated as an active designation), and US 167. As a result, US 167 was re-routed to be concurrent with I-10 heading west, then south along LA 3184 and LA 3025 between Johnson Street at LA 3025 and the I-10 interchange with I-49. LA 182 was subsequently re-routed to a short wrong-way concurrency along I-10 and US 167 to the I-49 interchange and took over the old route of US 167 along the Evangeline Thruway, running concurrent with US 90 along the Thruway to exit 115. Auxiliary routes LA 182-1 and LA 182-2 were decommissioned on July 10, 2022 and August 10, 2022 respectively, following a transfer of ownership to the cities of Broussard and Lafayette.

Major intersections

Auxiliary routes

Louisiana Highway 182-1

Louisiana Highway 182-1 (LA 182-1) ran  in an east-west direction from the junction of LA 182 and LA 89-1 to South Bernard Road west of downtown Broussard. It was part of LA 182 until a portion of the route in Broussard was transferred to local control in 2015, creating a gap in state maintenance. The section between South Deporres Street and St. Etienne Road became LA 182-2. LA 182 proper was rerouted along LA 89-1 and US 90 between the western terminus of LA 182-1 and the eastern terminus of LA 182-2.

LA 182-1 began at an intersection with West Pinhook Road and Southpark Road/Youngsville Highway (LA 89-1). LA 182 proper came in from the southeast on West Pinhook Road, before turning northeast onto Southpark Road to run concurrently with LA 89-1 to US 90. From this point, LA 182-1 continued southeast along West Pinhook Road for less than a mile, before ending at a traffic light regulated four-way intersection with South Bernard Road. West Pinhook Road, no longer a state highway from this point forward, continues east as West Main Street into downtown Broussard. LA 182-1 was decommissioned on July 18, 2022 after ownership of Pinhook Road was transferred from the LADOTD to the cities of Lafayette and Broussard.

Major intersections

Louisiana Highway 182-2

Louisiana Highway 182-2 (LA 182-2) ran  in a north-south direction from the junction of South De Porres Street in Broussard to a junction with St. Etienne Road and LA 182 eastbound on the west side of the US 90 freeway. It was part of LA 182 until a portion of the route in Broussard was transferred to local control in 2015, creating a gap in state maintenance. The section between LA 89-1 and South Bernard Road became LA 182-2. The main route of LA 182 was modified to run concurrently with LA 89-1 and US 90 between the western terminus of LA 182-1 and the eastern terminus of LA 182-2.

LA 182-2 began at the intersection of East Main Street and South De Porres Street in downtown Broussard. The highway continued east along Main Street, crossing the BNSF/Union Pacific Railroad tracks on the east side of town, coming to a wye intersection with East 2nd Street (former LA 731). Past 2nd Street, LA 182-2 curved south, paralleling US 90 to the east, before arriving at a junction with Albertson Parkway. The route was effectively cut in half by Albertson Parkway with the two sections being in-traversable from one another. From Alberston Parkway, the southern portion of LA 182-2 continued straight south to an entrance/exit ramp controlled junction with St. Etienne Road and the west frontage road of US 90, which serves as the eastbound lanes of LA 182. Southeast of this intersection, northbound LA 182 can be reached via a turnaround lane underneath the US 90 railroad overpass. LA 182-2 could not be directly accessed by westbound LA 182 traffic.  As the route was not connected directly with LA 182 proper, and LA 731 had been retired in 2021, LA 182-2 was entirely cut off from the rest of the state highway system. On August 10, 2022, LA 182-2 was retired after ownership of the route was transferred to the city of Broussard.

Major intersections

References

External links

La DOTD State, District, and Parish Maps

0182
Transportation in St. Landry Parish, Louisiana
Transportation in Lafayette Parish, Louisiana
Transportation in St. Martin Parish, Louisiana
Transportation in Iberia Parish, Louisiana
Transportation in St. Mary Parish, Louisiana
Transportation in Assumption Parish, Louisiana
Transportation in Terrebonne Parish, Louisiana
Transportation in Lafourche Parish, Louisiana
U.S. Route 90